Mohammadabad (also Romanized as Moḩammadābād) is a village in Tazian Rural District, in the Central District of Bandar Abbas County, Hormozgan Province, Iran. At the 2006 census, its population was 822, in 172 families.

References 

Populated places in Bandar Abbas County